The English conductor Sir Adrian Boult was a prolific recording artist.  Unlike many musicians, he felt at home in the recording studio and actually preferred working without an audience. His recording career ran from November 1920, when working with Diaghilev's Ballets Russes he recorded the ballet music, The Good-Humoured Ladies, to December 1978, when he made his final recording of music by Hubert Parry.

A discography of Boult recordings was compiled by Mike Ashman and published in Records and Recording, July 1974.  A further discography by Nigel Simeone was published in Sir Adrian Boult: Companion of Honour, 1980, Midas Books.  A third, A Boult Discography, compiled by Alan Sanders, was published by The Gramophone in 1981.  The following list draws on the first two of these, and on record companies' catalogues and back numbers of The Gramophone.  It consists chiefly of Boult's studio recordings.  Since his death, some recordings of his live concerts have been released by the BBC and others, and details of these are given below, where known.

The following abbreviations are used in the list:
BBCMM - BBC Music Magazine Compact Disk (CD).  The magazine includes a CD with each issue. 
BBCSO – BBC Symphony Orchestra
HMV – His Master's Voice: Unofficial name of label within the EMI recording group
LPO – London Philharmonic Orchestra
LSO – London Symphony Orchestra
NPO – New Philharmonia Orchestra
PPO –  Philharmonic Promenade Orchestra.  This was a pseudonym for the London Philharmonic, adopted for contractual reasons.  Many of Boult's recordings in the 1950s and 60s for the Pye Nixa and the Top Rank labels were made with the PPO. 
RPO – Royal Philharmonic Orchestra
WRC – World Record Club: a subsidiary label owned by EMI in the 1950s–70s

Recordings, listed alphabetically by composer
Alford
Colonel Bogey, march: LPO, WRC, 1968
Arne
Rule, Britannia!: BBCSO, HMV, 1937
Arnold
English Dances Sets I + II: LPO, Decca, 1958
Auber
Masaniello Overture: BBCSO, HMV, 1935
C.P.E. Bach
Symphony No. 3: LPO, HMV, 1957
Bach
Brandenburg Concertos 1-6: LPO, EMI, 1974
Klavier Concerto in C BWV 1061: Artur Schnabel, LSO, HMV, 1937
Mass in B minor: Qui Sedes and Agnus Dei: Kathleen Ferrier, LPO, Decca, 1953
St John Passion: All is fulfilled: Ferrier, LPO, Decca, 1953
St Matthew Passion: Grief for sin: Ferrier, LPO, Decca, 1953
Suite No. 3 BWV 1068: BBCSO, HMV, 1934
Violin Sonata No. 6 BWV 1019, Prelude (arr. Pick-Mangianalli): BBCSO, HMV, 1934
Fantasia and Fugue in C minor (arr. Elgar): LPO, HMV, 1974
The Wise Virgins (arr. Walton): LPO, Decca, 1955
Sergei Barsukov
Piano Concerto No. 2, Barsukov, LPO, Everest, 1967
Bartók
Divertimento for String Orchestra: PPO, Pye Nixa, 1957
Music for Strings, Percussion and Celesta: PPO, Pye Nixa, 1957
Bax
The Garden of Fand: LPO, Lyrita, 1972
Mediterranean: LPO, Lyrita, 1972
Northern Ballad No. 1: LPO, Lyrita, 1972
November Woods: LPO Lyrita, 1968
Tintagel
LPO, Decca, 1955
LPO, Lyrita, 1972
Beethoven
Coriolan Overture
BBCSO, HMV 2101, 1934
 NPO, HMV, 1971
 PPO, Top Rank, 1962
Egmont Overture
BBCSO, HMV, 1933
PPO, Top Rank, 1959
Fidelio Overture: PPO, Top Rank, 1962
Leonora No. 3 Overture: PPO, Top Rank, 1962
Piano Concerto No. 3: Solomon, BBCSO, HMV, 1942
Romance No. 2 in F: Hyman Bress, LPO, WRC, 1968
Symphony No. 3: PPO, Top Rank, 1962
Symphony No. 5: PPO, Top Rank, 1959
Symphony No. 6
PPO, Top Rank, 1959
LPO, HMV, 1978
Symphony No. 7: PPO, Top Rank, 1962
Symphony No. 8: BBCSO, HMV, 1932
The Ruins of Athens, Overture and Turkish March: Philharmonia, HMV, 1959
Violin Concerto
Ruggiero Ricci, LPO, Decca, 1953
Josef Suk, NPO, HMV, 1971
Berg
Lyric Suite – three movements for string orchestra: BBCSO, BBC, 1966 (live recording)
Berlioz 
Beatrice and Benedict Overture: PPO, Pye Nixa, 1960
Benvenuto Cellini Overture: PPO, Pye Nixa, 1960
Le Corsaire Overture: PPO, Pye Nixa, 1960
Les francs-juges Overture
BBCSO, HMV, 1937
 PPO, Pye Nixa, 1960
Rob Roy Overture: PPO, Pye Nixa, 1960
Le Roi Lear Overture
BBCSO, HMV, 1937
PPO, Pye Nixa, 1960
Roman Carnival Overture
BBCSO, HMV, 1933
PPO, Pye Nixa, 1960
Waverley: Overture: PPO, Pye Nixa, 1960
Bizet 
Petite Suite: Philharmonia, BBC, 1964 (live recording)
Bliss
Music for Strings
BBCSO, HMV, 1937
LPO, HMV, 1974
Piano Concerto, 2 recordings with Solomon: 
 New York Philharmonic, world premiere performance, 10 June 1939
 studio recording, Royal Liverpool Philharmonic, January 1943
Rout: Stella Power, British Symphony Orchestra, HMV, 1926
Borodin
Prince Igor, Polovtsian March: BBCSO, HMV, 1937
Brahms
Academic Festival Overture
LPO, HMV, 1951
PPO, Pye Nixa, 1956
LPO, WRC, 1968
LPO, HMV, 1973
Alto Rhapsody
Monica Sinclair, PPO, Pye Nixa, 1958
 Janet Baker, London Philharmonic Choir, LPO, HMV 1971
Hungarian Dances 17 and 18: LPO, HMV, 1951
Hungarian Dances 19, 20 and 21: BBCSO, HMV, 1939
Piano Concerto No. 1: Wilhelm Backhaus, BBCSO, HMV, 1933
Piano Concerto No. 2
Artur Schnabel, BBCSO, 1936
Louis Kentner, Philharmonia, 1959
Serenade No. 1
LPO, HMV, 1979
BBCSO, Intaglio, 1993
Serenade No. 2: LPO, HMV, 1979
Symphony No. 1
PPO, Pye Nixa, 1956
LPO, HMV, 1973
Symphony No. 2
PPO, Pye Nixa, 1956
LPO, HMV, 1971
Symphony No. 3
PPO, Pye Nixa, 1957
LSO, HMV, 1971
Symphony No. 4
PPO, Pye Nixa, 1956
LPO, HMV, 1973
Tragic Overture
BBCSO, HMV, 1933
PPO, Pye Nixa, 1958
LPO, HMV, 1971
Variations on a theme by Haydn: LPO, HMV, 1979
Brian
Symphony No. 1: Honor Sheppard, Shirley Minty, Ronald Dowd, Roger Stalman, BBC Chorus, BBC Choral Society, BBCSO, Testament, 1966 (live recording)
Bridge
Cherry Ripe: LPO, Lyrita, 1978
Lament for Strings: LPO, Lyrita, 1978
Sally in Our Alley: LPO, Lyrita, 1978
Sir Roger de Coverley: LPO, Lyrita, 1978
Suite for String Orchestra: LPO, Lyrita, 1978
Britten
Peter Grimes – Four Sea Interludes and Passacaglia: LPO, Westminster/Pye, 1966 (recorded August 1956)
Matinées musicales: PPO, Westminster/Pye Nixa, 1959 (recorded August 1956)
Soirées musicales 
PPO, Westminster/Pye Nixa, 1959 (recorded August 1956)
March: LPO, Lyrita, 1973
The Young Person's Guide to the Orchestra: LPO, Westminster/Pye (recorded August 1956)
Bruch
Kol Nidrei: Bunting, LPO, WRC, 1968 
Scottish Fantasy
Rabin, Philharmonia, Columbia, 1958 
 Alfredo Campoli, LPO, Decca, 1959 
Violin Concerto No. 1
Mischa Elman, LPO, Decca, 1956 
Menuhin, LSO, HMV, 1973
Violin Concerto No. 2: Menuhin, LSO, HMV, 1973
Butterworth
Two English Idylls: LPO, Lyrita, 1967
A Shropshire Lad, Rhapsody
British Symphony Orchestra, HMV, 1921
Hallé Orchestra, HMV, 1942 
LPO, Decca, 1955
The Banks of Green Willow 
LPO, Decca, 1955
LPO, Lyrita, 1967
Chopin
Piano Concerto No. 1 (arr Balakirev): Friedrich Gulda, LPO, Decca, 1954
Piano Sonata No. 2 – Funeral March (arr Elgar): BBCSO, HMV, 1932
Jeremiah Clarke
Trumpet Voluntary: Gordon Webb, LPO, WRC, 1968
Coates
The Dambusters March
LPO, WRC, 1968
NPO, Lyrita, 1976
From Meadow to Mayfair Suite: NPO, Lyrita, 1976
The Merrymakers Overture: NPO, Lyrita, 1976
Summer Days Suite: NPO, Lyrita, 1976
The Three Bears Phantasy: NPO, Lyrita, 1976
The Three Elizabeths Suite: NPO, Lyrita, 1976
Davies
RAF March Past: LPO, WRC, 1968
Delibes
Coppelia, Suite: PPO, Pye Nixa, 1956
Naila – Waltz (arr. Minkus):PPO, Pye Nixa, 1956
Sylvia, Suites: PPO, Pye Nixa, 1956
Delius
Marche Caprice: LPO, Lyrita, 1973
 Dohnányi
Piano Concerto No. 2: Dohnanyi, RPO, HMV, 1957 
Variations on a Nursery Theme
Julius Katchen, LPO, Decca, 1954 
 Ernő Dohnányi, RPO, HMV, 1957 
Julius Katchen, LPO, Decca, 1960
Dvořák
Cello Concerto Mstislav Rostropovich, RPO, HMV, 1958
Elgar 
The Apostles: Sheila Armstrong, Helen Watts, Robert Tear, John Carol Case, Benjamin Luxon, Clifford Grant, London Philharmonic Choir, LPO, HMV, 1974
Bavarian Dances
LPO, Decca, 1955 
LPO, HMV, 1968
Caractacus – Triumphal March, LPO, HMV, 1975
Carillon, LPO, HMV, 1975
Cello Concerto 
Pablo Casals, BBCSO, HMV, 1946 
Paul Tortelier, LPO, HMV, 1973 
Chanson de Matin
LPO, Decca, 1955 
LPO, HMV, 1968
Chanson de Nuit
LPO, Decca, 1955 
LPO, HMV, 1968
Choral Songs
BBC Chorus, HMV, 1982 (recorded February 1967) 
Cockaigne
PPL, Westminster/Pye Nixa (recorded August 1956)
LPO, HMV, 1972
Dream Children: LPO, HMV, 1956
The Dream of Gerontius
Prelude: BBCSO, HMV, 1934
Helen Watts, Nicolai Gedda, Robert Lloyd, London Philharmonic Choir, NPO, 1976
Enigma Variations 
BBCSO, HMV, 1936 
LPO, HMV, 1954
LPO, HMV, 1962
LSO, HMV, 1970
Falstaff
LPO, HMV, 1951
PPO, Westminster/Pye Nixa, 1957 (recorded August 1956)
LPO, HMV, 1974
Overture Froissart
LPO, HMV, 1956
LPO, HMV, 1972
Imperial March 
BBCSO, HMV, 1937
LPO, HMV, 1977
Overture In the South Alassio
LPO, HMV, 1956
LPO, HMV, 1972
Introduction and Allegro
BBCSO, HMV, 1937
LPO, HMV, 1954
LPO, HMV, 1973
The Kingdom: Margaret Price, Yvonne Minton, Alexander Young, John Shirley-Quirk, London Philharmonic Choir, LPO, HMV, 1969
The Music Makers: Janet Baker, London Philharmonic Choir, LPO, 1967
Nursery Suite: LPO, HMV, 1956
Polonia: LPO, 1975
Pomp and Circumstance Marches 1-5
LPO, HMV, 1956
LPO, HMV, 1977
The Sanguine Fan: LPO, 1974
Serenade for Strings: LPO, HMV, 1973
Sospiri: BBCSO, HMV, 1937
Symphony No. 1 
LPO, HMV, 1950
LPO, Lyrita, 1968
LPO, HMV, 1977
Symphony No. 2 
Symphony No. 2 BBCSO, HMV, 1945
PPO, Westminster/Pye Nixa, 1957 (recorded August 1956)
Scottish National Orchestra, 1964
LPO, Lyrita, 1968
LPO, HMV, 1976
Violin Concerto
Alfredo Campoli, LPO Decca, 1955
Yehudi Menuhin, NPO, HMV, 1966
Ida Haendel, LPO, HMV, 1978
The Wand of Youth Suites 1 and 2
Suite No. 1 only: LPO, HMV, 1954
Suites 1 and 2: LPO, HMV, 1968
Falla
El Amor Brujo – Fire Dance: WRC, 1968
Finzi
The Fall of the Leaf, LPO, Lyrita, 1978
Introit, Rodney Friend, LPO, Lyrita,
Nocturne, LPO, Lyrita, 1978
Prelude for String Orchestra, LPO, Lyrita, 1978
Romance for String Orchestra, LPO, Lyrita, 1978
A Severn Rhapsody, LPO, Lyrita, 1978
Franck
Symphonic Variations
Anderson Tyrer, British Symphony Orchestra, Velvet Face 599-600, 1923
Clifford Curzon, LPO, Decca, 1960
Symphony in D minor: "London Orchestral Society Orchestra" Originally recorded for Reader's Digest, 1959
Gershwin
Cuban Overture: London Philharmonic Orchestra, WRC, 1968
Glinka
Russlan and Ludmilla Overture LPO, WRC, 1967
Gluck
Alceste, Overture: BBCSO, HMV, 1937
Gounod
O Divine Redeemer:Kirsten Flagstad, LPO, Decca, 1958
Grainger
Over the Hills and far away, Children's March: LPO, Lyrita, 1973
Grieg
Piano Concerto: Shura Cherkassky, LPO, WRC, 1966
Franz Gruber
Silent Night: Kirsten Flagstad, LPO, Decca, 1958
Patrick Hadley
One Morning in Spring – sketch for orchestra: BBCSO, BBC, (1966 live recording)
Handel
Acis and Galatea: Peter Pears, Joan Sutherland,  Owen Brannigan, Philomusica Orchestra, L'Oiseau Lyre-Decca, 1960
Judas Maccabeus – Father of Heaven: Ferrier, LPO, Decca, 1953
Messiah 
He was despised; O thou that tallest: Ferrier, LPO, Decca, 1953
Jennifer Vyvyan, Norma Procter, George Maran, Owen Brannigan, London Philharmonic Choir, LPO, Decca, 1954
Joan Sutherland, Grace Bumbry,  Kenneth McKellar,  David Ward, London Symphony Chorus, LSO, Decca, 1961
Music for the Royal Fireworks: LPO, HMV, 1949
Organ Concertos,  Op 4 Nos 1-6 and Op 7 Nos 1-6: E. Power Biggs, LPO, 1960
Overture in D minor (arr. Elgar): LPO, HMV, 1972
Samson – Return O God of Hosts: Ferrier, LPO, Decca, 1953
Water Music: PPO, Pye Nixa, 1956
Holst
Beni Mora: LPO, Lyrita, 1972
Choral Symphony: Felicity Palmer, London Philharmonic Choir, LPO, HMV, 1974
Egdon Heath LPO Decca 1962
Fugal Overture LPO, Lyrita, 1968
Hammersmith Prelude and Scherzo LPO, Lyrita, 1972
Japanese Suite LSO Lyrita, 1971
The Hymn of Jesus BBC Chorus, BBCSO, Decca, 1962
The Perfect Fool Ballet Music LPO Decca
LPO, Decca, 1955
LPO, Decca, 1962
The Planets 
BBCSO and chorus, HMV, 1945
London Philharmonic Choir, PPO, recorded 1954, Pye Nixa NLP 903, 1954
Vienna Academy Chorus, Vienna State Opera Orchestra, recorded Apr, 1959, Whitehall WHS 20033, 1960
Ambrosian Singers, NPO, recorded 21-22 Jul 1966, HMV ASD 2301, 1967
London Choral Society, BBCSO, recorded live 7 Sep 1973, BBCMM 359, 2013
Geoffrey Mitchell Choir, LPO, recorded Jul-Aug 1978 & May 1979, HMV ASD 3649, 1979
Scherzo: LPO, Lyrita, 1972
A Somerset Rhapsody: LPO, Lyrita, 1972
Suite in E flat Op.28 No1 – March (arr Gordon Jacob):, LPO, Lyrita, 1973
Howells
Concerto for Strings: LPO, HMV. 1974
Elegy: NPO, Lyrita, 1976
Merry-Eye: NPO, Lyrita, 1976
Music for a Prince: NPO, Lyrita, 1976
Processional: LPO, Lyrita, 1978
Humperdinck
Hansel and Gretel, Overture
British Symphony Orchestra, HMV, 1927
BBCSO, HMV, 1932
Ireland
Concertino Pastorale: LPO, Lyrita, 1966
A Downland Suite: Elegy, Minuet, LPO, Lyrita, 1966
Epic March: LPO, Lyrita, 1966
 The Forgotten Rite: LPO, Lyrita, 1966
The Holy Boy: LPO, Lyrita, 1966
Legend: Eric Parkin, LPO, Lyrita, 1966
London Overture: LPO, Lyrita, 1966
Mai-Dun: LPO, Lyrita, 1966
The Overlanders: LPO, Lyrita, 1971
Piano Concerto in E-flat major: Eric Parkin, LPO, Lyrita, 1968
Satyricon: LPO, Lyrita, 1966
Scherzo and Cortege from Julius Caesar: LPO, Lyrita, 1971
These Things Shall Be: John Carol Case, LPO, Lyrita, 1968
Tritons, LPO, Lyrita, 1971
Khachaturian
Piano Concerto: Mindru Katz, LPO, Pye, 1959
Lalo
Cello Concerto, Nelsova, LPO, Decca, 1954
Liddell
Abide with me: Kirsten Flagstad, LPO, Decca, 1958
Liszt
Piano Concerto No.1 in E flat, Anderson Tyrer, British Symphony Orchestra, Velvet Face 557-58, 1923
Fantasia on Hungarian Folktunes: Edith Farnadi, PPO, Pye Nixa, 1959
Totentanz, Edith Farnadi: PPO, Pye Nixa, 1959
Litolff
 Concerto Symphonique, 'Scherzo' From Concerto Symphonique No. 4 
Clifford Curzon, LPO, Decca, 1960
Shura Cherkassky, LPO, WRC, 1969
Mahler
Kindertotenlieder
Christa Ludwig, Philharmonia, Columbia, 1959
Kirsten Flagstad, Vienna Philharmonic, Decca, 1960
Lieder eines fahrenden Gesellen: Kirsten Flagstad, Vienna Philharmonic, Decca, 1960
Symphony No. 1: LPO, Top Rank, 1960
Symphony No. 3: Kathleen Ferrier, BBCSO, Testament (1947 live recording)
Mendelssohn:
Elijah – O rest in the Lord: Norma Procter, LPO, Decca, 1955
The Hebrides: BBCSO, HMV, 1934
A Midsummer Night's Dream, Overture 
BBCSO, HMV, 1945
PPO, Pye Nixa, 1957
A Midsummer Night's Dream, Incidental Music
Nocturne: BBCSO HMV, 1933
Wedding March BBCSO, HMV, 1945
Scherzo, Intermezzo, Nocturne, Wedding March, Dance of the Clowns, Fairies' March: PPO, Pye Nixa, 1957
Ruy Blas, Overture: BBCSO, HMV, 1935
Symphony No. 3 PPO Pye Nixa, 1958
Symphony No. 4 
PPO, Pye Nixa 1958
LPO, WRC, 1968
Violin Concerto 
Yehudi Menuhin, Philharmonia, HMV, 1953
Michael Rabin, Philharmonia, Columbia, 1958
Alfredo Campoli, LPO, Decca, 1959
Maureen Smith, LPO, WRC, 1968
Meyerbeer
Le Prophète – Coronation March: BBCSO, HMV, 1937
Moeran
Cello Concerto: Peers Coetmore, LPO, Lyrita, 1970
Overture for a Masque: LPO, Lyrita, 1970
Rhapsody No. 2: LPO, Lyrita, 1970
Sinfonietta: LPO, Lyrita, 1968
Symphony in G minor: NPO, Lyrita, 1975
Monn 
Cello Concerto - 1st movement: William Pleeth, LPO, HMV, 1957
Mozart
Concerto for 2 pianos: Artur Schnabel, Karl-Ulrich Schnabel, LSO, HMV, 1937
Cosi fan tutte – Overture
BBCSO, HMV, 1934
BBCSO, HMV, 1939
Horn Concerto No. 3: Aubrey Brain, BBCSO, HMV, 1940
Piano Concerto No. 17: André Previn, LSO, HMV, 1974
Piano Concerto No. 20: Annie Fischer, Philharmonia, Columbia, 1960
Piano Concerto No. 23: Annie Fischer, Philharmonia, Columbia, 1960
Piano Concerto No. 24: André Previn, LSO, HMV, 1974
Der Schauspieldirektor – Overture: BBCSO DB 1969, 1934
Symphony No. 32: BBCSO DB 6172, 1944
Symphony No. 41: BBCSO DB 1966-69, 1934
Die Zauberflöte – Overture: LPO, T 730/ST 730, 1968
Nicolai
The Merry Wives of Windsor – Overture
BBCSO, HMV, 1934
LPO, HMV, 1951
Paganini
Violin Concerto No. 1: Yehudi Menuhin, LPO, HMV, 1956
Parry
Blest Pair of Sirens 
Oxford Bach Choir, LSO, HMV, 1948
London Philharmonic Choir and Orchestra, HMV, 1967
Elegy for Brahms: LPO, HMV, 1978
English Suite: LSO Lyrita, 1971
Jerusalem: Flagstad, LPO, Decca, 1958
Lady Radnor's Suite: LSO Lyrita, 1971
Overture to an unwritten tragedy: LSO, Lyrita, 1971
Symphonic Variations
LSO, Lyrita, 1971
LPO, HMV, 1978
Symphony No. 5: LPO, HMV, 1978
Ponchielli
La Gioconda – Dance of the Hours: LPO, WRC, 1968
Prokofiev
Lieutenant Kijé – suite: Paris Conservatoire Orchestra, Decca, 1956
The Love of Three Oranges – suite: LPO, Decca, 1956
Piano Concerto No. 1: Mindru Katz, LPO, Pye Nixa, 1959
Rachmaninoff
Piano Concerto No. 1: Peter Katin, LPO, Decca, 1959
Piano Concerto No. 2: Clifford Curzon, LPO, Decca, 1956
Rhapsody on a Theme of Paganini 
Julius Katchen, LPO, Decca, 1954
Julius Katchen, LPO, Decca, 1960
Symphony No. 2: LPO, Decca, 1966
Symphony No. 3: LPO, Decca, 1959
Ravel
Daphnis et Chloé Suite No. 2: Philharmonia, BBC, 1964 (live performance)
Tzigane: Michael Rabin, Philharmonia, Columbia, 1958
Respighi
Feste Romane: PPO, Westminster, 1959
Rossiniana: PPO, Westminster, 1959
Rimsky-Korsakov
Russian Easter Festival Overture LPO, Decca, 1959
The Snow Maiden – Dance of the Tumblers LPO, WRC, 1967
Rodgers
Guadalcanal March: LPO, WRC, 1968
Rossini
La Boutique fantasque (arr. Respighi): British Symphony Orchestra, HMV, 1926
(See also Britten: Matinées and Soirées musicales)
Rubbra
Symphony No. 7: LPO, Lyrita, 1970
Saint-Saëns
Cello Concerto No. 1: Zara Nelsova, LPO, Decca, 1954
Danse Macabre LPO, WRC, 1968
Samson et Dalila – Bacchanale: BBCSO, HMV, 1933
Wedding Cake: LPO, WRC 1968
Sarasate
Zigeunerweisen: Hyman Bress, LPO, WRC, 1968
Scarlatti
The Good-humoured Ladies (arr. Tommasini.): British Symphony Orchestra, HMV, 1921
Schubert
Symphony No. 4 LPO
Symphony No. 8 in B minor ("Unfinished"): Philharmonia, BBC, (1964 live recording)
Symphony No. 9 Great C major 
BBCSO, HMV, 1935
LPO, Pye Nixa, 1957
LPO, HMV, 1972
Schumann 
Manfred – Overture: BBCSO, HMV, 1934
Piano Concerto: Shura Cherkassky, LPO, WRC, date
Symphony No. 1 PPO, Pye Nixa, 1957
Symphony No. 2 PPO, Pye Nixa, 1957
Symphony No. 3 PPO, Pye Nixa, 1957
Symphony No. 4 PPO, Pye Nixa, 1957
Searle
Symphony No. 1:  LPO, Decca, 1960
Shostakovich
Symphony No. 6: LPO, Everest, 1967
Symphony No. 12: BBCSO, Intaglio, 1993
Sibelius 
The Bard: PPO, Pye Nixa, 1958
En saga: PPO, Pye Nixa, 1958
Finlandia: PPO, Pye Nixa, 1958
Lemminkainen's Return: PPO, Pye Nixa, 1958
Night Ride and Sunrise BBCSO DB 2795-96(-/36: PPO, Pye Nixa, 1958
The Oceanides
BBCSO, HMV, 1936
PPO, Pye Nixa, 1958
Pohjola's Daughter: PPO, Pye Nixa, 1958
Romance in C: BBCSO, HMV, 1940
The Swan of Tuonela: PPO, Pye Nixa, 1958
Symphony No. 7: RPO, BBC, (1963 live recording)
Tapiola: PPO, Pye Nixa, 1958
The Tempest – prelude: PPO Pye Nixa, 1958
Violin Concerto: Yehudi Menuhin, LPO, HMV, 1956
Simpson
Symphony No. 1 LPO, HMV, 1957
Smetana
The Bartered Bride – Overture; Polka; Furiant; Dance of the Comedians LPO, WRC, 1967
Ma Viast – Vltava LPO, WRC, 1967
Smyth
 Fête galante – Minuet: Light Symphony Orchestra, HMV, 1939
Two French Folk Melodies: Light Symphony Orchestra, HMV, 1939
Sousa
Marches – El Capitan; Liberty Bell; Stars and Stripes for Ever; Washington Post: LPO, WRC, 1968
Stamitz
Symphony in E flat - 1st and 2nd movement LPO, HMV, 1957
Johann Strauss I
Radetzky March LPO, WRC, 1968
Stravinsky
Circus Polka: LPO, WRC, 1968
Sullivan
Overture di Ballo: New Symphony Orchestra of London, Reader's Digest, 1960
Suppé
Boccaccio – Overture: PPO, Pye Nixa, 1958
Fatinitza – Overture: PPO, Pye Nixa, 1958
Light Cavalry – Overture PPO, Pye Nixa, 1958
Morning, Noon and Night in Vienna – Overture PPO, Pye Nixa, 1958
Poet and Peasant – Overture PPO, Pye Nixa, 1958
Die Schone Galathea – Overture Philharmonic Promenade Orch, Pye Nixa, 1958
Tchaikovsky
Capriccio Italien: BBCSO, HMV, 1940
Concert Fantasia: Peter Katin, LPO, Decca, 1959
1812 Overture: 
LPO, Decca, 1952
Coldstream Guards Band, LPO, WRC, 1968
Eugene Onegin – Polonaise: BBCSO, HMV, 1937
Hamlet: LPO, Decca, 1952
Marche Slave LPO, T 683/ST 683, 1968
Piano Concerto No. 1: Paul Badara-Skoda, PPO, Pye Nixa, 1956
Romeo and Juliet
LPO, Pye Nixa, 1961
LPO, WRC, 1968
Serenade for Strings: BBCSO, HMV, 1940
Suite No. 3
Paris Conservatoire Orchestra, Decca, 1956
LPO, HMV, 1974
Symphony No. 3 LPO, Decca, 1956
Symphony No. 5 Pye Nixa, 1960
Symphony No. 6 "Pathétique":  LPO, Pye Nixa, 1960
Violin Concerto 
Mischa Elman, LPO, Decca, 1954
Hyman Bress, LPO, WRC, 1968
Carl Teike
Old Comrades: LPO, WRC, 1958
Traditional and Miscellaneous
The Battle Hymn of the Republic: LPO, WRC, 1968
The British Grenadiers 
BBCSO HMV, 1937
LPO, WRC, 1968
The Coronation of Queen Elizabeth II: Coronation Choir and Orchestra, HMV, 1953
Jubilate: Kirsten Flagstad, LPO, Decca, 1958
Lillibulero: LPO, WRC, 1968
O Come All Ye Faithful: Kirsten Flagstad, LPO, Decca, 1958
Vaughan Williams
Concerto for 2 pianos: Vitya Vronsky, Victor Babin, LPO, HMV, 1969
Dona Nobis Pacem London Philharmonic Choir, LPO, HMV, 1974
English Folk Songs Suite (arr Gordon Jacob)
LPO, Pye Nixa, 1954
Vienna State Opera Orchestra, Westminster, 1961
LPO, HMV, 1971
Fantasia on the 'Old 104th' LPO, HMV, 1970
Fantasia on a Theme of Thomas Tallis
BBCSO HMV, 1940
Philharmonic Promenade Orchoestra, Pye Nixa, 1954
Vienna State Opera Orchestra, Westminster, 1961
LPO, Lyrita, 1970
NPO, BBC [live], 1972
LPO, HMV, 1976
Flos Campi: William Primrose, BBC Chorus, Philharmonia, HMV, 1947
Greensleeves Fantasia
PPO, Pye Nixa, 1954
Vienna State Opera Orchestra, Westminster, 1961
LSO, HMV, 1970 (p 1971)
In the fen country: NPO, HMV, 1968
Job 
BBCSO, HMV, 1946
LPO, Decca, 1954
LPO, Everest, 1958
LSO, HMV, 1970 (p 1971)
The Lark Ascending 
Jean Pougnet, LPO, HMV, 1953
Hugh Bean, NPO, HMV, 1967
Norfolk Rhapsody 
LPO, Pye Nixa, 1954
New Philharmonia, HMV, 1968
Old King Cole LPO, Decca, 1955
Partita for Double String Orchestra
LPO, Decca, 1960
LPO, HMV 1975 (p 1976)
The Pilgrim's Progress: John Noble, Raimund Herincx, John Carol Case, Wynford Evans, Christopher Keyte, Geoffrey Shaw, Bernard Dickerson, Sheila Armstrong, Marie Hayward, Gloria Jennings, Ian Partridge, John Shirley-Quirk, Terence Sharpe, Robert Lloyd, Norma Burrowes, Alfreda Hodgson, Joseph Ward, Richard Angas, John Elwes, Delia Wallis, Wendy Eathorne, Gerald English, London Philharmonic Choir and LPO, HMV, 1972
Serenade to Music 
Festival Choir and Orchestra, HMV, 1951
Norma Burrowes, Sheila Armstrong, Susan Longfield, Marie Hayward, Alfreda Hodgson, Gloria Jennings, Shirley Minty, Meriel Dickinson, Ian Partridge, Bernard Dickerson, Wynford Evans, Kenneth Bowen, Richard Angas, John Carol Case, John Noble & Christopher Keyte, LPO, HMV, 1969 (p 1970)
Symphony No. I (A Sea Symphony) 
Isobel Baillie, John Cameron, London Philharmonic Choir, LPO, Decca, 1954
Sheila Armstrong, John Carol Case, London Philharmonic Choir, LPO, HMV, 1968
Symphony No. 2 (A London Symphony) 
LPO, Decca, 1952
LPO, HMV, 1971
Symphony No. 3 (Pastoral) 
Margaret Ritchie, LPO, Decca, 1953
Margaret Price, NPO, HMV, 1968
Symphony No. 4 
LPO, Decca, 1955
NPO, HMV, 1968
Symphony No. 5 
LPO, Decca, 1954
LPO, HMV, 1970
Symphony No. 6 
LSO, HMV, 1949
LPO, Decca, 1954
NPO, HMV, 1967
Symphony No. 7 (Sinfonia Antartica) 
Margaret Ritchie, (superscriptions spoken by John Gielgud) LPO, Decca, 1954
Norma Burrowes, London Philharmonic Choir, LPO, HMV, 1970
Symphony No. 8 
LPO, Decca, 1960
LPO, HMV, 1969
Symphony No. 9 
LPO, Everest, 1960
LPO, HMV, 1970
Thanksgiving for Victory: Luton Choral Society, LPO, HMV, 1953
Towards the Unknown Region: Sheila Armstrong, John Carol Case, London Philharmonic Choir, LPO, HMV, 1974
The Wasps, incidental music
LPO, Decca, 1954
LPO, HMV, 1968
Wagner
Götterdämmerung – Dawn and Siegfried's Rhine Journey; Siegfried's Funeral Music: LPO, HMV, 1973
Lohengrin – Preludes to Acts 1 and 3: NPO, HMV, 1972
Die Meistersinger 
Prelude: BBCSO, HMV, 1933
Prelude and Prelude to Act 2: NPO, HMV, 1972
Parsifal – Good Friday Music 
BBCSO, HMV, 1933
LSO, HMV, 1974
Siegfried – Forest Murmurs LPO, ASD 2934, 1973
Siegfried Idyll, LSO, HMV, 1974
Tannhäuser
Prelude: NPO, HMV, 1972
Prelude to Act 3 LPO, HMV, 1973
Tristan und Isolde – Prelude 
BBCSO, HMV, 1933
NPO, HMV, 1972
Die Walküre – Ride of the Valkyries: LPO, HMV, 1973
Josef Wagner
Under the Double Eagle LPO, WRC, 1968
Walton
Belshazzar's Feast: John Noble, London Philharmonic Choir, LPO, Pye Nixa, 1954
Crown Imperial, 
BBCSO, HMV, 1937
LPO, HMV, 1977
 Hamlet: Funeral March, LPO, Lyrita, 1973
Portsmouth Point – Overture 
BBCSO, HMV, 1937
LPO, Decca, 1955
LPO, WRC, 1968
Scapino: LPO, Decca, 1955
Siesta: Decca, 1955
Symphony No. 1: PPO, Westminster/Pye Nixa, 1964 (recorded August 1956)
Weber
Euryanthe – Overture: BBCSO, HMV, 1937
Der Freischütz – Overture BBCSO, HMV, 1933
Wieniawski
Violin Concerto No. 1: Michael Rabin, Philharmonia, Columbia, 1958
Violin Concerto No. 2: Mischa Elman, LPO, Decca, 1956
Williamson
Organ Concerto: Malcolm Williamson,  LPO, Lyrita, 1974
Violin Concerto: Yehudi Menuhin, LPO, HMV, 1972
Wolf
Italian Serenade: Philharmonia, HMV, 1959
Wolf-Ferrari
The Jewels of the Madonna – intermezzo: LPO, WRC, 1968
Zimmermann
Anchors Away: LPO, WRC, 1968

Notes

Discographies of classical conductors